was a Japanese seinen manga magazine published by ASCII Media Works. The magazine was first published digitally on August 9, 2012 with volume 0, and started monthly publication with the following issue released on October 15, 2012. From April 2013 to April 2014, the magazine was released biweekly. Dengeki G's Comic began to be published monthly in print with the June 2014 issue sold on April 30, 2014. The magazine ended its print version on March 30, 2019 and the manga serialized in it continued as a web publication on Kadokawa's ComicWalker service and Dwango's Niconico Seiga website.

Serialized manga

Notes and references

 These manga were transferred from Dengeki G's Magazine.
 These manga were transferred from Dengeki G's Festival! Comic.

External links
 

2012 establishments in Japan
2019 disestablishments in Japan
Defunct magazines published in Japan
Dengeki G's Magazine
Magazines established in 2012
Magazines disestablished in 2019
Magazines published in Tokyo
Monthly manga magazines published in Japan
Seinen manga magazines